Herb Scannell (born January 11, 1957) is an American media executive and businessman. He served as the president of Nickelodeon and TV Land from 1996 to 2006, was the founding CEO of Next New Networks, and the president of BBC Worldwide America. He served as the CEO of the Mitú Network until the Summer 2018. He became the president and chief executive officer of KPCC-FM in January 2019.

Early life and education
Scannell was born on Long Island in New York to an Irish father from Boston and Puerto Rican mother as the youngest of four. He received his primary and secondary education in his hometown. His mother taught him Spanish at home helping him to become fluent in both English and Spanish. As a child he would spend every summer with his Puerto Rican family on the island becoming very attached to his Hispanic roots.

Scannell graduated from high school in 1975 and entered Boston College. As a student he became the manager of WZBC (the campus' radio station). He graduated in 1979 with a bachelor's degree in English.

Career 
Scannell was hired by WHN Radio (New York) in 1980, before joining the cable television revolution in 1981 at The Movie Channel before it merged with Showtime, and eventually worked his way up to the position of director of program promotion for Showtime/The Movie Channel.

In March 1988, Scannell joined Nickelodeon as director of programming, overseeing program scheduling. In 1989, he was named vice president for Nickelodeon. He oversaw the development and launch of Nick News. In 1990, he served as executive vice president for Nickelodeon Network and U.S. Television. He oversaw the direction of Nickelodeon and Nick at Nite cable networks. He was also fundamental in the development of Nick Jr. and Nicktoons.

President of Nickelodeon
In February 1996, he was named president of Nickelodeon and TV Land, succeeding Geraldine Laybourne. Under his leadership, Nickelodeon (which, under his watch, included such animated series as SpongeBob SquarePants, Danny Phantom, The Fairly OddParents, Avatar: The Last Airbender, The Wild Thornberrys, The Angry Beavers, Catscratch and Hey Arnold!) and TV Land became the highest-rated cable networks launched within the past seven years. Nickelodeon also expanded to other areas such as live theatrical shows, magazines and feature films. He was also responsible for launching Dora the Explorer, The Brothers García (which is based on Los García, a show he used to watch in Puerto Rico) and Taina.

Later years
On August 22, 2005, he participated in "The State of Hispanic America National Conference" as a member of the Executive Roundtable. Herb Scannell currently lives in Manhattan, New York with his wife and two daughters. In January 2007, Scannell became the founding CEO of Next New Networks, a new media company of micro-television networks distributed through internet technology that helped establish the concept of the multi-channel network; the company had 2010's #1 and #2 YouTube videos in the world. Co-founders include Emil Rensing, Fred Seibert, Timothy Shey, and Jed Simmons. The company's lead partner was Spark Capital. The company's first group of networks include VOD Cars, Fast Lane Daily, and Channel Frederator. In June 2010, Scannell became the president of BBC Worldwide America.

Awards and recognitions
Among the many awards and recognitions which he received are:
 CTAM Awards
 BPME Awards
 NAMIC Vision and Image Award (2001)
 Profile in Latino Leaders Magazine (2004)
 Amnesty International Award (2004)

See also

List of Puerto Ricans

References

External links
 
Latino Leaders

1957 births
Boston College alumni
Living people
People from Long Island
Nickelodeon executives
American television executives
American people of Puerto Rican descent
American people of Irish descent
BBC executives
20th-century American businesspeople
21st-century American businesspeople